Glasgow Springburn may refer to:

 Glasgow Springburn (UK Parliament constituency)
 Glasgow Springburn (Scottish Parliament constituency)
 Glasgow Maryhill and Springburn (Scottish Parliament constituency)